Juan Alberto Becerra Acosta Aguilar de Quevedo (born August 20, 1973 in Mexico City) is a Mexican journalist. He has a bachelor's degree in psychology from the Universidad Latinoamericana (ULA).

Becerra Acosta is a news anchor for  Mexico City news show, Informe Capital (21N), hosted by Mexico City public television broadcaster, Capital 21. He has previously hosted, amongst other teleivison shows, "Tu Ciudad Es", "#AsambleaConstituyente", "ConstituyenteCDMX", "MiradasCDMX", and "S.O.S., Adolescente En Casa".

He is an active member of the editorial board of Algarabía Magazine, a former chief editor of Tiempo Libre Magazine, and a columnist at Contratiempo Chicagón Magazine.

In 2011 he hosted a radio programme, "Dios Creó a la Mujer" with Lucy Orozco on Mexican public radio station IMER. Thereafter, in 2012 he created a radio series about theatre and drama called  "Revelaciones Dramáticas". In 2013 he ended his radio career with an 80 episode broadcast entitled "La Escena en su Papel".

In 2009, the Ball House Museum in Mexico City hosted a photojournalism exhibition of 26 images of Mexican theatre captured by Becerra Acosta between 2005 and 2009, entitled "52 Weeks of Theatre". In November 2016, the exhibition was rehosted by the Museum of Mexico City.

Awards
In 2022, got Lopez Obrador's pet award.
In 2014 Becerra Acostta was recognised with the "Pillar of Mexican Theatre" award by the Mexican Theatre Centre and the executive committee of the International Theatre Institute (ITI UNESCO).

References

1973 births
Living people
Mexican journalists
Male journalists
Alumni of the European Schools
Universidad Latinoamericana alumni